Montvale may refer to:

Places
Montvale (Worcester, Massachusetts), a historic district
Montvale, an unincorporated community in Middlesex County, Massachusetts, near Woburn
Montvale, New Jersey, a borough in Bergen County
Montvale (NJT station)
Montvale, Virginia,  a census-designated place in Bedford County, Virginia

Other uses
Montvale, the Intel codename of an Itanium processor
Montvale Hotel, a hotel in Spokane, Washington
Montvale Public Schools